Ascanio Ugolini (died 1660) was a Roman Catholic prelate who served as Bishop of Muro Lucano (1652–1660).

Biography
On 9 Feb 1652, Ascanio Ugolini was appointed Bishop of Muro Lucano by Pope Innocent X.
On 3 Mar 1652, he was consecrated bishop by Fabio Chigi, Secretary of State, with Girolamo Boncompagni, Archbishop of Bologna, and Ranuccio Scotti Douglas, Bishop Emeritus of Borgo San Donnino, serving as co-consecrators. 
He served as Bishop of Muro Lucano until his death in May 1660.

References

External links and additional sources
 (for Chronology of Bishops) 
 (for Chronology of Bishops) 

17th-century Italian Roman Catholic bishops
Bishops appointed by Pope Innocent X
1660 deaths